James Walter "Jim" Sedin (June 25, 1930 – February 23, 2021) was an American ice hockey player. He won a silver medal at the 1952 Winter Olympics.

References

External links

1930 births
American men's ice hockey defensemen
Ice hockey people from Saint Paul, Minnesota
Ice hockey players at the 1952 Winter Olympics
2021 deaths
Medalists at the 1952 Winter Olympics
Olympic silver medalists for the United States in ice hockey